Hohe Hölle is a 893.8 m (2,932 ft) mountain of Bavaria, Germany. 

Mountains of Bavaria
Mountains and hills of the Rhön